German submarine U-1208 was a Type VIIC U-boat built for Nazi Germany's Kriegsmarine for service during World War II.
She was laid down on 30 June 1943 by Schichau-Werke, Danzig as yard number 1578, launched on 13 January 1944 and commissioned on 6 April 1944 under Korvettenkapitän Georg Hagene.

Design
German Type VIIC submarines were preceded by the shorter Type VIIB submarines. U-1208 had a displacement of  when at the surface and  while submerged. She had two shafts and two  propellers.

U-1208 was fitted with five  torpedo tubes (four fitted at the bow and one at the stern), fourteen torpedoes, one  SK C/35 naval gun, (220 rounds), one  Flak M42 and two twin  C/30 anti-aircraft guns. The boat had a complement of between forty-four and sixty.

Service history
The boat's career began with training at 8th U-boat Flotilla on 6 April 1944, followed by active service on 1 January 1945 as part of the 11th Flotilla for the remainder of her short service.

Wolfpacks
U-1208 took part in no wolfpacks.

Fate
All hands were lost.

Summary of raiding history

References

Bibliography

External links

German Type VIIC submarines
1944 ships
U-boats commissioned in 1944
Ships lost with all hands
U-boats sunk in 1945
U-boats sunk by depth charges
U-boats sunk by British warships
World War II shipwrecks in the Atlantic Ocean
World War II submarines of Germany
Ships built in Danzig
Maritime incidents in February 1945
Ships built by Schichau